Geoffrey Bruce Tasman Lovell (born 11 July 1966) is an Australian former cricketer.

Lovell was born at Sydney in July 1966. He studied at The University of Sydney, before undertaking his post-graduate studies in England at Exeter College, Oxford. While studying at Oxford, he made his debut in first-class cricket for Oxford University against Hampshire at Oxford in 1991. He played first-class cricket for Oxford until 1993, making 24 appearances. Playing as a batsman, he scored 939 runs at an average of 31.30. He made two centuries, with a high score of 144 against Cambridge University in The University Match of 1993. Lovell also made a single first-class appearance each for a combined Oxford and Cambridge Universities cricket team against the touring Pakistanis in 1992 and for the Combined Universities cricket team against the touring Australians in 1993, with him making 96 against the Pakistanis. In addition to playing first-class cricket while at Oxford, he also made a single List A one-day appearance for the Combined Universities against Hampshire in the 1993 Benson & Hedges Cup. Lovell is currently the vice-warden of St Paul's College at the University of Sydney, having held the post since 2016.

References

External links

1966 births
Living people
Cricketers from Sydney
University of Sydney alumni
Alumni of Exeter College, Oxford
Australian cricketers
Oxford University cricketers
Oxford and Cambridge Universities cricketers
British Universities cricketers